Herbert Smith (1916–2006) was a British art director. He was nominated for a BAFTA for Best British Art Direction for his work on the 1965 film The Hill.

Selected filmography
 The Traitor (1957)
 The Roman Spring of Mrs. Stone (1961)
 The 7th Dawn (1964)
 The Hill (1965)
 Shalako (1968)
 Connecting Rooms (1970)
 Game for Vultures (1979)

References

Bibliography 
 Andreychuk, Ed. Louis L'Amour on Film and Television. McFarland, 2010.

External links 
 

1916 births
2006 deaths
British art directors
People from Hammersmith